The 2019 Belgian Athletics Championships was the year's national outdoor track and field championships for Belgium. It was held on 31 August and 1 September at the King Baudouin Stadium in Brussels. 

The national championships in 10,000 metres and women's 3000 metres steeplechase took place on Saturday 4 May in Oudenaarde. Hammer throw events took place in Nivelles.

Results

Men

Women

References

BK Alle Categorieen-CB Toutes Categories. LiveResults. Retrieved 2019-09-07.
Time schedule for BK 10km AC en Mas - 3000m steeple AC-V. Toastit Live. Retrieved 2019-09-07.

External links
 French Belgian Athletics Federation website
 Flemish Belgian Athletics Federation website

Belgian Athletics Championships
Belgian Athletics Championships
Belgian Athletics Championships
Belgian Athletics Championships
Belgian Athletics Championships
Belgian Athletics Championships
Sports competitions in Brussels